The Datsun Type 17 is a small car produced in Japan in the 1930s.  It was the last in a line of Datsun small cars produced before Nissan's resources were diverted to military materials for the Second Sino-Japanese War.

Design
The Datsun 17 was almost identical to the preceding Datsun 16 but distinguished by a wide vertical bar in middle of the front grille and a simpler interior.

Drivetrain
The Datsun 17 was mechanically identical to the preceding Datsun 16.

Production
Production of the Datsun 17 started in Yokohama in April 1938 and, according to Nissan, continued until January 1944, although Alan Bent claims that it finished in late 1938 as part of the cessation civilian car production that followed the Japanese decision to focus on military vehicles.

See also
 Datsun 17T

References

Type 17
Rear-wheel-drive vehicles
Cars introduced in 1938